Luckaitztal (Lower Sorbian Lukajca Dolk) is a municipality in the Oberspreewald-Lausitz district, in Lower Lusatia, Brandenburg, Germany.

History
From 1815 to 1947, the constituent localities of Luckaitztal (Buchwäldchen, Muckwar, Gosda and Schöllnitz) were part of the Prussian Province of Brandenburg.

From 1952 to 1990, they were part of the Bezirk Cottbus of East Germany.

On 31 March 2002, the municipality of Luckaitztal was formed by merging the municipalities of Buchwäldchen, Muckwar, Gosda and Schöllnitz.

Demography

References

Populated places in Oberspreewald-Lausitz